Myoxocephalus ochotensis is a species of marine ray-finned fish belonging to the family Cottidae, the typical sculpins.  It is native to the northwest Pacific in the Sea of Okhotsk. Very little is known about this species.

References

ochotensis
Fish described in 1929
Fish of Russia
Fish of Japan